Carina Rydberg (born 18 July 1962) is a Swedish writer. She caused a scandal in 1997 when she included unflattering descriptions of two famous Swedish men in her autobiographical novel Den högsta kasten (The Highest Caste).

Biography

Born in Stockholm, she grew up in the suburbs of Rågsved and Vårberg. After studying film, psychology and literature at Stockholm University, in 1987 she published her first novel Kallare än Kargil (Colder than Kargil) about a disillusioned woman's travels in India.

Her autobiographical Den högsta kasten (The Highest Caste) published in 1997 caused a sensation with unflattering accounts of two famous Swedes she named in the book. Describing how it feels to be an outcast rejected by the men she desires, the novel goes far beyond what is normally expected of the author's role. Similarly her Djävulsformeln (Devil's Formula, 2000) contains a vendetta against a number of famous men.

Rydberg was the screenwriter for Svart Lucia (1992), a psychological thriller.

Works
1987: Kallare än Kargil
1989: Månaderna utan R 
1990: Osalig ande 
1994: Nattens amnesti
1997: Den högsta kasten
2000: Djävulsformeln
2006: Den som vässar vargars tänder

Awards
 De Nios Vinterpris 2008

References

1962 births
Living people
Swedish women novelists
Writers from Stockholm
20th-century Swedish women writers
20th-century Swedish novelists